Records 2000 is an Estonian record label. As of 2013, its market share was the highest in the country. It is owned by OÜ Aenigma, which is owned by Peeter Kaljuste.

See also 
 Üllar Jörberg

References 

Estonian record labels